IAPMO Standards are the plumbing and mechanical standards of the International Association of Plumbing and Mechanical Officials (IAPMO).  For more than thirty years, IAPMO’s standards-developing efforts have primarily focused on plumbing product standards. This concentration was primarily due to IAPMO members’ expertise from more than 50 years of writing and updating the Uniform Plumbing Code (UPC). IAPMO is an American National Standards Institute (ANSI)-recognized Standards Development Organization (SDO).

Recently, IAPMO’s efforts have broadened to include standards for mechanical products. Drawing on their years of experience, many IAPMO members have also contributed to the development of the Uniform Mechanical Code (UMC). Mechanical product standards cover heating, ventilation, cooling and refrigeration system products.

IAPMO also publishes standards covering products used in the Recreational Vehicle and Manufactured Housing Industry called IAPMO Trailer Standards.

See also
 IAPMO
 IAPMO R&T
 Uniform Codes
 Uniform Mechanical Code
 Uniform Plumbing Code
 Uniform Swimming Pool, Spa and Hot Tub Code
 Uniform Solar Energy and Hydronics Code
 Building officials

Plumbing